Carver Creek, Carver's Creek or Carvers Creek may refer to:

Carver Creek (Minnesota), a stream in Minnesota
Carver Creek (Missouri), a stream in Missouri
Carver's Creek Methodist Church, a historic church in North Carolina
Carvers Creek State Park, a state park in North Carolina

See also
Carver Branch